Masters of Rock is a large heavy metal music festival in the Czech Republic. The main styles represented on this festival are power, speed and heavy metal, though the production tries to make the fest more open for other rock and metal styles, such as progressive rock/metal, hardcore, death metal or even ska. It takes place in Vizovice, Czech Republic and in the past has featured bands such as Tarja Turunen, Manowar, Sweet, Twisted Sister, HammerFall, Stratovarius, Helloween, Gamma Ray, Nightwish, Rhapsody of Fire, Kreator, Edguy, Rage, Apocalyptica, Within Temptation, Children of Bodom, Avantasia, Accept, Dream Theater, Sebastian Bach, Behemoth, Amon Amarth, Sabaton and many more. The 2005 attendance was over 20,000, the 2006 one over 25,000 and finally the 2007 was over 30,000. The festival is held every summer and the Winter morphosis takes place in November in the town of Zlín. Since 2010 the main stage of summer festival is named after Ronnie James Dio, who died earlier that year.

Lineups

2022
Masters of Rock 2022 was held from Thursday 7 July to Sunday 10 July.

2021
Cancelled - (COVID-19 pandemic) - the 18th edition of the festival will take place from 7 to 10 July 2022.

2020
Cancelled - COVID-19 pandemic

2019
Masters of Rock 2019 was held from Thursday, 11 July to Sunday, 14 July.

2018
Masters of Rock 2018 was held from Thursday, 12 July to Sunday, 15 July

2017
Masters of Rock 2017 was held from Thursday, 13 July to Sunday, 16 July (SOLD OUT)

2016
Masters of Rock 2016 was held from Thursday, 14 July to Sunday, 17 July (SOLD OUT)

2015
Masters of Rock 2015 was held from Thursday, 9 July to Sunday, 12 July

2014
Masters of Rock 2014 was held from Thursday, 10 July to Sunday, 13 July

2013
Masters of Rock 2013 was held from Thursday, 11 July to Sunday, 14 July

2012
Masters of Rock 2012 was held from Thursday, 12 July to Sunday, 15 July

2011
Masters of Rock 2011 was held from Thursday, 14 July to Sunday, 17 July

2010
Masters of Rock 2010 was held from Thursday, 15 July to Sunday, 18 July

2009
Masters of Rock 2009 was held from Thursday, 9 July to Sunday, 12 July

2008
Masters of Rock 2008 was held from Thursday, 10 July to Sunday, 13 July

2007
Masters of Rock 2007 was held from Thursday, 12 July to Sunday, 15 July

2006
Masters of Rock 2006 was held from Thursday, 13 July to Sunday, 16 July

2005
Masters of Rock 2005 was held from Friday, 15 July to Sunday, 17 July

2004
Masters of Rock 2004 was held from Friday, 2 July to Sunday, 4 July

2003
Masters of Rock 2003 was held from Friday, 27 June to Saturday, 28 June

External links
Masters of Rock official site

References

Heavy metal festivals in the Czech Republic
Zlín District
Tourist attractions in the Zlín Region
Rock festivals in the Czech Republic
Music festivals established in 2003
Summer events in the Czech Republic